Onthophagus martialis, is a species of dung beetle endemic to Sri Lanka.

References 

Scarabaeinae
Beetles of Sri Lanka
Insects described in 1914